Kushi Kushiga ( Happy Happily) is a 2004 Indian Telugu-language action comedy film directed by G. Ram Prasad. Starring Jagapati Babu, Ramya Krishna, Sangeetha, Nikita Thukral, Venu Thottempudi and music composed by S. A. Rajkumar. The film is a remake of the 2003 Malayalam film Chronic Bachelor starring Mammootty which was remade in Tamil earlier as Engal Anna starring Vijaykanth the same year. The film recorded as Above Average at box office.

Plot
The film begins in a village where fierce rivalry upholds between the families of Chalasi Rayudu and Neelakantam. Today, it continues between their heirs Surya Prakash / SP and Bhavani respectively. Plus, the feud hits the roof when SP triumphs over Bhavani and revives his property when she vows to destroy him. SP is a chronic bachelor who hates love & woman and stays opposite a women’s hostel. Therein, all he cares about is a girl Sandhya to which she is unbeknownst. Bhama an impish girl, is a new admission in the hostel and falls for SP at first sight. Therefrom, she chases and perturbs SP with her annoyance to receive his love but fails. Parallelly, Srikumar is a casanova, the son of SP’s maternal uncle Seetaramaiah that nurtured him. SP assures his uncle to reform Sri. So, he nails the guy and his sidekick Errababu with him. Anguished Sri tries to get out but he backs after viewing Sandhya whom he truly loves. Now Sri & Bhama mingle to support each other. After a few comic scenes, Bhama discovers SP as Sandhya’s sponsor and questions him. Then, he proclaims Sandhya as his half-sister and rearwards. 

20 years ago, in their village his father Rayudu is an arbitrator. Before his marriage, he secretly wedlock a woman Ramalakshmi and they had two progeny Shekar & Sandhya. Exploiting it, Neelamkantam seeks to scandal Rayudu as vengeance. At that point, to shield Rayudu’s honor Ramalakshmi untruths that they don’t have any relationship. This has led to humiliated Shekar quitting and becoming a wanderer. Surprisingly, SP & Bhavani are fond of each other at that hour. Even, SP’s sister Lakshmi and Bhavani’s cousin Vishnu are also in love. Taking it into account, Neelakantam counterfeits by slaughtering Vishnu and incriminates Rayudu which ends with his suicide. In addition, Neelakantam grabs their property when SP flares up on him. As a result, confrontation arises between SP & Bhavani. Moreover, SP proceeds to revive his stepmother’s family but spotting her hatred towards him, he left behind and still silently looked after Sandhya. 

Being aware of it, Bhama promises to help SP. Firstly, she brings Sandhya nearer to SP by revealing him as her sponsorer and also arranges her birthday. On that occasion, shockingly, Bhama divulged as Bhavani’s sister who reviles SP for snaring her sister. Accordingly, she hinders and seizes Bhama but she skips through Sri as the medium. Later, SP grasps the love affair of Sri & Sandhya and also the changed form of Sri. Hence, he decides to knit them which is rejected by Sri’s parents as Sandhya is an orphan. Whereon, SP breaks out the fact which Sandhya overhears. Despite that, she showers love to her brother. 

During the time of engagement, Neelakantam arrives along with SP’s enraged elder brother Shekar who resembles their father. Shekar takes Sandhya back by force and fixes her alliance with Bhavani’s brother Ravindra as he is oblivious of Neetakantam’s ploy. Here, SP vows to unite Sri & Sandhya and wipe off everyone who stands in the way. On the wedding day, a brawl erupts between the sibling which is paused by Sandhya claiming that she cares about both of them. Immediately, SP discloses the diabolic shade of Neelakantam and proves his father as rectitude which makes Sheker realize. Hearing this, Bhavani attempts suicide when SP rescues her and they reunite. Finally, the movie ends on a happy note with the marriages of SP & Satya Bhama and Srikumar & Sandhya.

Cast

 Jagapati Babu as Surya Prakash / SP 
 Venu Thottempudi as Sri Kumar
 Ramya Krishna as Bhavani
 Sangeetha as Satya Bhama
 Nikita Thukral as Sandhya
 Bhanu Chander
 Devan
 Sunil
 Ali
 Dharmavarapu Subramanyam
 Giri Babu
 Delhi Rajeswari
 Pragathi

Soundtrack

Music composed by S. A. Rajkumar. Music released on Supreme Music Company.

References

External links
 Kushi Kushiga at the Internet Movie Database
 http://www.apunkachoice.com/titles/kus/kushi-kushiga/mid_34429/

2004 films
Telugu remakes of Malayalam films
Films scored by S. A. Rajkumar
2000s Telugu-language films